Dennis Herman Blair (born June 5, 1954) is a former Major League Baseball pitcher for the Montreal Expos during the 1974–1976 seasons and for the San Diego Padres in 1980. Blair grew up in Rialto, California, and attended Eisenhower High School in Rialto.

After his major league career ended in 1982,  he worked and attended California State University San Bernardino.  He graduated in 1993 with a Liberal Studies Bachelor of Arts degree and completed his master's degree at Lamar University.

He moved to Texas and taught students with special needs in Garland and Mesquite Independent School Districts. He retired from teaching in 2016 and lives in the Phoenix area part of the year.  He is married and has two sons, a step-son and three grandchildren.

External links

1954 births
Living people
American expatriate baseball players in Canada
Baseball players from California
Cal State San Bernardino Coyotes baseball players
Charlotte O's players
Cocoa Expos (baseball) players
Denver Bears players
Hawaii Islanders players
Jamestown Falcons players
Major League Baseball pitchers
Memphis Blues players
Montreal Expos players
Québec Carnavals players
Rochester Red Wings players
San Diego Padres players
Sportspeople from Rialto, California
Sportspeople from Middletown, Ohio
West Palm Beach Expos players